"My Sentimental Friend" is a song written by Geoff Stephens and John Carter and performed by Herman's Hermits.  The song is Herman's Hermits' second highest charting song in the UK, reaching No. 2 in the UK chart. It also reached No. 2 in Ireland, No. 3 in Australia, No. 6 in New Zealand, and No. 1 in South Africa.

The song was produced by Mickie Most.

Charts

References

1969 songs
1969 singles
Number-one singles in South Africa
Songs written by Geoff Stephens
Songs written by John Carter (musician)
Herman's Hermits songs
Song recordings produced by Mickie Most
MGM Records singles